M. laeta may refer to:

 Marginella laeta, a margin snail
 Megachile laeta, a leafcutter bee
 Meromyza laeta, a grass fly
 Mimacraea laeta, an African butterfly
 Mitromorpha laeta, a sea snail
 Musurgina laeta, an owlet moth
 Myrmarachne laeta, an antmimicking spider